V.I.S.A. is a French independent record label created in 1982 by Thierry De Lavau and Yves Lecarpentier.

V.I.S.A.’s first releases were tapes by French alternative punk rock bands, but it eventually expanded the music range and formats releasing CDs and LPs from other European bands of new wave, art rock, modern classical and experimental music.

In 1995 V.I.S.A. released Deep Inside, an album by RAENDOM.

After a long, long sleep V.I.S.A. became ViSA and came back in 2014 with Terrain d'Entente a compilation with various artists.
In 2015, for the COP21, ViSA released "Disappearing world" an EP with the band Igor and the hippie land.
In November 2016 ViSA released "Wonderful Circle", the Igor & the hippie land's second album
In April 2017 ViSA released a double LP for the 35th anniversary of Radio Libertaire (Les 35 ans de Radio Libertaire) with various French rebel music taken from the usual playlist of this radio. The front cover is designed by Jacques Tardi.

Discography 
The V.I.S.A. discography is divided into three collections: Androidia Flux (AF), Rebel Flux (RF), and Ultima Flux (UF).

Adroidia Flux

Co-production with Bondage Records

Rebel Flux

Ultima Flux

See also 
 List of record labels

External links
 Site officiel ViSA 
 1983-1985 Label History (in "Nyark Nyark", a french punk archives book)

French independent record labels
Record labels established in 1982
Rock record labels
Experimental music record labels
1982 establishments in France